Kei Pilz (died 2001) was a Japanese Michelin star winning head chef and co-owner of the restaurant Shiro in Ahakista, County Cork, Republic of Ireland. She died in 2001.

Together with her husband Werner Pilz, a German, she was running the restaurant in her own living room. They opened Shiro "to have something to do". That turned out in a restaurant that was awarded one Michelin star in the period 1996–2001. Aside from cooking, she specialized in Japanese watercolour calligraphy and paintings.

Although living in Berlin at the time, Pilz bought the villa Woodlands in 1983. She and her family moved to Ireland and renovated the villa before opening the restaurant.

References

Japanese chefs
Irish chefs
2001 deaths
Women chefs
Year of birth missing
Place of birth missing
Head chefs of Michelin starred restaurants